David Hansen (born 6 October 1981) is an Australian countertenor.

Biography
Hansen was born in Sydney, Australia, and attended St Andrew's Cathedral School and Newington College. He studied violin, piano, and was a boy treble in school choirs. He studied in the class of Andrew Dalton at the Sydney Conservatorium of Music. He continued his musical education with James Bowman, David Harper and Graham Pushee.

Career
He made his first European appearances in 2004 at the Aix-en-Provence Festival, performing in Purcell's Dido and Aeneas. Hansen first performed in the United Kingdom in concerts with the Scottish Chamber Orchestra, conducted by Emmanuelle Haïm. He also performed with Il Complesso Barocco in Fernando by Handel, conducted by Alan Curtis during the Spoleto Festival in Italy.

He sang roles in various operas, including Bertarido in Handel's Rodelinda, conducted by Alan Curtis, Nerone in Monteverdi's L'incoronazione di Poppea at Victorian Opera, Ottone in Vivaldi's Griselda at Pinchgut Opera and Cherubino in Mozart's Le nozze di Figaro at the Teatro Comunale di Sassari. He also performed in the U.S. premiere of Thomas Adès' The Tempest at the Santa Fe Opera, conducted by Alan Gilbert, Handel's Giulio Cesare at the Theater an der Wien, conducted by René Jacobs, Monteverdi's L'Orfeo at the Berlin State Opera, conducted by René Jacobs, Handel's Semele at the Théâtre Royal de la Monnaie, conducted by Christophe Rousset, in Giovanni Andrea Bontempi's Il Paride at the Innsbruck Festival of Early Music, directed by Christina Pluhar. He has worked with Stefan Herheim, Jonathan Kent, Barrie Kosky and Christof Loy.

Hansen's non-operatic engagements have included Carmina Burana with the Berlin Philharmonic, conducted by Sir Simon Rattle, Handel's Solomon, conducted by René Jacobs, Bach's St John Passion, performed with Les Musiciens du Louvre Grenoble conducted by Marc Minkowski, Handel's Parnasso in festa, Messiah and Giulio Cesare conducted by Andrea Marcon, Fabio Biondi and Emmanuelle Haïm, respectively, and Britten's Canticles, at the Wiener Konzerthaus.

Repertoire

Opera

Oratorios

Discography

Albums

Awards and nominations

ARIA Music Awards
The ARIA Music Awards is an annual awards ceremony that recognises excellence, innovation, and achievement across all genres of Australian music. They commenced in 1987. 

! 
|-
| 2013
| Rivals: Arias for Farinelli & Co.
| Best Classical Album
| 
| 
|-

References

External links

"David Hansen: It's a Long Way to the Top" by Melissa Lesnie, Limelight, 6 September 2013
David Hansen, IMG Artists

1981 births
Living people
21st-century Australian male opera singers
Operatic countertenors
Australian performers of early music
Singers from Sydney
People educated at Newington College